Sweetacres is the second album from Auckland band The Nudie Suits. It was recorded between 2004 and 2005 in Melbourne, Australia, and in Auckland.

Track listing

"Inheriting the Stereo" – 2:44
"Cabin Blues" – 2:48
"Harangue" – 2:43
"Sweetacres" – 4:03
"Bright Lights" – 3:08
"At the Old Diary" – 4:02
"Hubba Hubba Mother" – 3:17
"Here Comes Bronco" – 2:59
"Losing to Rock'n'Roll" – 2:27
"I've Had Enough" - 3:07

Personnel
Mark Lyons - Vocals, Acoustic Guitar, Bass, Keyboards, Percussion, Harmonica
Dionne Taylor - Hawaiian Steel Guitar, Harmony Vocals
Tam Taylor - Violin, Keyboards, Harmony Vocals
Mark Elton - Double Bass
John Pain - Electric Bass
Michelle Lewit - Violin
Nick Martin, Steve Marrow, Ryan McPhun - Drums

External links
Lil' Chief Records: The Nudie Suits
The Nudie Suits on MySpace
Lil' Chief Records

2006 albums
The Nudie Suits albums
Lil' Chief Records albums